Pristigenys alta, the toro or short bigeye, is a species of fish in the family Priacanthidae. Some anglers refer to this fish as "toro snapper", but it is not a snapper, and only distantly related to the fish of the snapper family.

Description
The most noticeable characteristic of Pristigenys alta is its very large eyes. This species is blunt, bright red, and ovate, with a flattened, disk-like body. It is commonly about 20 cm in length, but can grow to maximum length of 30 cm. It has rough scales, and large ventral fins.

Distribution
This species is found in the Western Atlantic along the east coast of North America from North Carolina southwards, the Gulf of Mexico, in the Caribbean Sea and West Indies.

Habitat
Pristigenys alta is a solitary marine fish that lives mainly in reef areas at depths of between 5 and 200 metres. It can also be found on rocky bottoms.

References

alta
Fish described in 1862
Fish of the Atlantic Ocean